Haplogroup J-M267, also commonly known as Haplogroup J1, is a subclade (branch) of Y-DNA haplogroup J-P209 (commonly known as haplogroup J) along with its sibling clade haplogroup J-M172 (commonly known as haplogroup J2). (All these haplogroups have had other historical names listed below.)

This haplogroup is found today in significant frequencies in many areas in or near the Arabian Peninsula and Western Asia. Out of its native Asian Continent, it is found at very high frequencies in Sudan. It is also found at very high but lesser extent in parts of the Caucasus, Ethiopia and parts of North Africa and amongst most Levant peoples, incl. Jewish groups, especially those with Cohen surnames. It can also be found much less commonly, but still occasionally in significant amounts, in parts of southern Europe and as far east as Central Asia

Origins
Since the discovery of haplogroup J-P209 it has generally been recognized that it shows signs of having evolved ~ 20,000 years ago somewhere in northwestern Iran, the Caucasus, the Armenian Highlands, and northern Mesopotamia. The frequency and diversity of both its major branches, J-M267 and J-M172, in that region makes them candidates as genetic markers of the spread of farming technology during the Neolithic, which is proposed to have had a major impact upon human populations.

J-M267 has several recognized subclades, some of which were recognized before J-M267 itself was recognized, for example J-M62 . With one notable exception, J-P58, most of these are not common . Because of the dominance of J-P58 in J-M267 populations in many areas, discussion of J-M267's origins require a discussion of J-P58 at the same time.

Distribution

Africa

North Africa and Horn of Africa 
North Africa received Semitic migrations, according to some studies it may have been diffused in recent time by Arabs who, mainly from the 7th century A.D., expanded to northern Africa ( and ). However the Canary Islands is not known to have had any Semitic language. In North Africa J-M267 is dominated by J-P58, and dispersed in a very uneven manner according to studies so far, often but not always being lower among Berber and/or non-urban populations. In Ethiopia there are signs of older movements of J-M267 into Africa across the Red Sea, not only in the J-P58 form. This also appears to be associated with Semitic languages. According to a study in 2011, in Tunisia, J-M267 is significantly more abundant in the urban (31.3%) than in the rural total population (2.5%) .

Asia

South Asia
J*(xJ-M172) was found in India among Indian Muslims.

West Asia
The area including eastern Turkey and the Zagros and Taurus mountains, has been identified as a likely area of ancient J-M267 diversity. Both J-P58 and other types of J-M267 are present, sometimes with similar frequencies.

Levant and Semitic populations 
J-M267 is very common throughout this region, dominated by J-P58, but some specific sub-populations have notably low frequencies.

Arabian peninsula 

J-P58 is the most common Y-Chromosome haplogroup among men from all of this region.

Europe
J-M267 is uncommon in most of Northern and Central Europe. It is, however, found in significant pockets at levels of 5–10% among many populations in southern Europe. A recent study with the extant variation concludes that the Caucasus is likely to be the source of the Greek and Italian haplogroup J1-M267 chromosomes.

Caucasus 
The Caucasus has areas of both high and low J-M267 frequency. The J-M267 in the Caucasus is also notable because most of it is not within the J-P58 subclade.

Subclade Distribution

J-P58

It is very prevalent in many areas where J-M267 is common, especially in parts of North Africa and throughout the Arabian peninsula. It also makes up approximately 70% of the J-M267 among the Amhara of Ethiopia. Notably, it is not common among the J-M267 of the Caucasus.

 proposed that J-P58 (that they refer to as J1e) might have first dispersed during the Pre-Pottery Neolithic B period, "from a geographical zone, including northeast Syria, northern Iraq and eastern Turkey toward Mediterranean Anatolia, Ismaili from southern Syria, Jordan, Palestine and northern Egypt." They further propose that the Zarzian material culture may be ancestral. They also propose that this movement of people may also be linked to the dispersal of Semitic languages by hunter-herders, who moved into arid areas during periods known to have had low rainfall. Thus, while other haplogroups including J-M267 moved out of the area with agriculturalists who followed the rainfall, populations carrying J-M267 remained with their flocks ( and ).

According to this scenario, after the initial neolithic expansion involving Semitic languages, which possibly reached as far as Yemen, a more recent dispersal occurred during the Chalcolithic or Early Bronze Age (approximately 3000–5000 BCE), and this involved the branch of Semitic which leads to the Arabic language. The authors propose that this involved a spread of some J-P58 from the direction of Syria towards Arab populations of the Arabian Peninsula and Negev.

On the other hand, the authors agree that later waves of dispersion in and around this area have also had complex effects upon the distributions of some types of J-P58 in some regions. They list three regions which are particularly important to their proposal: 
The Levant (Syria, Jordan, Israel and Palestine). In this area,  note a "patchy distribution of J1c3 or J-P58 frequency" which is difficult to interpret, and which "may reflect the complex demographic dynamics of religion and ethnicity in the region".
The Eastern Anatolia, northern Iraq and western Iran. In this area,  recognize signs that J-M267 might have an older presence, and on balance they accept the evidence but note that it could be in error.
The southern area of Oman, Yemen and Ethiopia. In this area,  recognize similar signs, but reject it as possibly a result of "either sampling variability and/or demographic complexity associated with multiple founders and multiple migrations."

The "YCAII=22-22 and DYS388≥15" cluster 
Studies show that J-P58 group is not only in itself very dominant in many areas where J-M267 or J1 are common, but it also contains a large cluster which had been recognized before the discovery of P58. It is still a subject of research though.

This relatively young cluster, compared to J-M267 overall, was identified by STR markers haplotypes - specifically YCAII as 22-22, and DYS388 having unusual repeat values of 15 or higher, instead of more typical 13  This cluster was found to be relevant in some well-publicized studies of Jewish and Palestinian populations ( and ). More generally, since then this cluster has been found to be frequent among men in the Middle East and North Africa, but less frequent in areas of Ethiopia and Europe where J-M267 is nevertheless common. The genetical pattern is therefore similar to the pattern of J-P58 generally, described above, and may be caused by the same movements/migration of people .

 refers to this overall cluster with YCAII=22-22 and high DYS388 values as an "Arabic" as opposed to a "Eurasian" type of J-M267. This Arabic type includes Arabic speakers from Maghreb, Sudan, Iraq and Qatar, and it is a relatively homogeneous group, implying that it might have dispersed relatively recently compared to J-M267 generally. The more diverse "Eurasian" group includes Europeans, Kurds, Iranians and Ethiopians (despite Ethiopia being outside of Eurasia), and is much more diverse. The authors also say that "Omanis show a mix of Eurasian pool-like and typical Arabic haplotypes as expected, considering the role of corridor played at different times by the Gulf of Oman in the dispersal of Asian and East African genes."  also noted the anomalously high apparent age of Omani J-M267 when looking more generally at J-P58 and J-M267 more generally.

This cluster in turn contains three well-known related sub-clusters. First, it contains the majority of the Jewish "Cohen modal haplotype", found among Jewish populations, but especially in men with surnames related to Cohen. However, this particular variant "is absent" from two particular "non-Arab Middle Eastern populations", namely "Jews and Muslim Kurds" (even though both of these populations do have high levels of J-P209).  noted not only the presence of the GMH in the Maghreb but also that J-M267 in this region had very little diversity. They concluded that J-M267 in this region is a result of two distinct migration events: "early Neolithic dispersion" and "expansions from the Arabian peninsula" during the 7th century. later agreed that this seemed consistent with the evidence and generalized from this that distribution of the entire YCAII=22-22 cluster of J-M267 in the Arabic-speaking areas of the Middle East and North Africa might in fact mainly have an origin in historical times.

More recent studies have emphasized doubt that the Islamic expansions are old enough to completely explain the major patterns of J-M267 frequencies.  rejected this for J-P58 as a whole, but accepted that "some of the populations with low diversity, such as Bedouins from Israel, Qatar, Sudan and UAE, are tightly clustered near high-frequency haplotypes suggesting founder effects with star burst expansion in the Arabian Desert". They did not comment on the Maghreb.

They also estimate that the Cohen modal haplotype must be older than 4500 years old, and maybe as much as 8600 years old - well before the supposed origin of the Cohanim. Only the "Palestinian & Israeli Arab" modal had a strong correlation to an ethnic group, but it was also rare. In conclusion, the authors were negative about the usefulness of STR defined modals for any "forensic or genealogical purposes" because "they were found across ethnic groups with different cultural or geographic affiliation".

 disagreed, at least concerning the Cohen modal haplotype. They said that it was necessary to look at a more detailed STR haplotype in order to define a new "Extended Cohen Modal Haplotype" which is extremely rare outside Jewish populations, and even within Jewish populations is mainly only found in Cohanim.

Tofanelli et al. 2014 responded by saying: "In conclusion, while the observed distribution of sub-clades of haplotypes at mitochondrial and Y chromosome non-recombinant genomes might be compatible with founder events in recent times at the origin of Jewish groups as Cohenite, Levite, Ashkenazite, the overall substantial polyphyletism as well as their systematic occurrence in non-Jewish groups highlights the lack of support for using them either as markers of Jewish ancestry or Biblical tales."

J-M368
The correspondence between P58 and high DYS388 values, and YCAII=22-22 is not perfect. For example the J-M267 subclade of J-P58 defined by SNP M368 has DYS388=13 and YCAII=19-22, like other types of J-M267 outside the "Arabic" type of J-M267, and it is therefore believed to be a relatively old offshoot of J-P58, that did not take part in the most recent waves of J-M267 expansion in the Middle East . These DYS388=13 haplotypes are most common in the Caucasus and Anatolia, but also found in Ethiopia .

Phylogenetics and distribution
There are several confirmed and proposed phylogenetic trees available for haplogroup J-M267. The following phylogeny or family tree of J-M267 haplogroup subclades is based on the ISOGG (2012) tree, which is in turn based upon the YCC 2008 tree and subsequent published research.

J1 (L255, L321, M267)
 J1* J1* clusters are found in Eastern Anatolia and parts of the Caucasus.
 J1a (M62) Found at very low frequency in Britain.
 J1b (M365.1) Found at low frequency in Eastern Anatolia, Iran and parts of Europe.
 J1c (L136)
J1c* Found at low frequency in Europe.
 J1c1 (M390)
 J1c2 (P56) Found sporadically in Anatolia, East Africa, the Arabian Peninsula and Europe.
 J1c3
J1c3* Found at low frequency in the Levant and the Arabian Peninsula.
 J1c3a (M367.1, M368.1) Previously known as J1e1.
 J1c3b (M369) Previously known as J1e2.
 J1c3c (L92, L93) Found at low frequency in South Arabia.
 J1c3d (L147.1) Accounts for the majority of J1, the predominant haplogroup in the Arabian peninsula.
J1c3d* Accounts for the majority of J1 in Yemen, Cohen Jews (both Rabbinical and Karaitic), but missing from Quraysh including Sharif of Makkah of Banu Hashem clan.
 J1c3d1 (L174.1)
 J1c3d2 (L222.2) Accounts for the majority of J1c3d in Saudi Arabia. An important element of J1c3d in North Africa.
 J1c3d2*
 J1c3d2a (L65.2/S159.2)

Ancient DNA

Alalakh Amorite city-state
Five out 12 male individuals from Alalakh who lived between 1930-1325 BC, belonged to haplogroup J1-P58.

Arslantepe archaeological complex
One out of 18 male individuals from Arslantepe who lived c. 3491-3122 BC, belonged to haplogroup J1-Z1824.

Ancient city of Ebla
Three out of 6 individuals from Ebla who lived between 2565-1896 BC, belonged to J1-P58. Ebla was an ancient East Semitic-speaking city and kingdom in Syria in the early Bronze age that was destroyed by the Akkadians.

Karelia 
A member of haplogroup J1-M267 is found among eastern hunter-gatherers from Karelia, Northeast Europe living ~ 8.3 kya. This branch is absent in other ancient European hunter-gatherers. Unfortunately, it is not possible to put this sample in the context of the current haplogroup J1-M267 variation because of the poor quality of the DNA sequence.

Sardinia 
Olivieri et al. found a J1c3 haplotype in one of their ancient samples from Sardinia, dated to 6190–6000 calBP.

Satsurblia
An ancient sample of J1 was found at Satsurblia Cave circa 11,000 BC, specifically belonging to the rare J1-FT34521 subclade. The ancient individual from Satsurblia was male with black hair, brown eyes, and light skin.

Tell Kurdu
One out of 4 male individuals from Tell Kurdu who lived circa 5706-5622 BC, belonged to J1-L620

See also

Genetics

Y-DNA J Subclades

Y-DNA Backbone Tree

References

Footnotes

Works Cited

Journals

 See also Supplementary Material.

. (Also see Errata)

Websites
Haplogroups/Phylogeny
 Ongoing Corrections/Additions by citizen scientists.
Haplotype/SNP research Projects. See also Y-DNA haplogroup projects (ISOGG Wiki)
 This is an ongoing research project by citizen scientists. Over 2300 members.
 This is an ongoing research project by citizen scientists. Over 150 members.
 This is an ongoing research project by citizen scientists. Over 550 members.
 This is an ongoing research project by citizen scientists. Over 1050 members.
 This is an ongoing research project by citizen scientists. Over 450 members.
Haplogroup-Specific Ethnic/Geographical Group Projects

 This is an ongoing research project by citizen scientists. Over 950 J members.
 This is an ongoing research project by citizen scientists. Over 400 members.

Further reading

Phylogenetic Notes

External links
J-M267 Ancient Samples Map
J-M267 Relevant Publications
Y-Full J-M267 Phylogenetic Tree
J-M267 Phylogenetic Tree
J project and J1-M267 project
J1b Project
Y-DNA Haplogroup J and its Subclades - 2011

J